Martin Brem (born 23 April 1959), also known by his stage name Marty Brem, is an Austrian-born former singer, record executive and entrepreneur currently active in Salzburg and Los Angeles. He is known to wider audiences for his participation in the Eurovision Song Contest, representing Austria in 1980 as a member of the band Blue Danube and as a soloist in 1981, singing "Wenn du da bist" amidst somewhat unusual choreography performed by female dancers in an equally unusual selection of costumes.

After Brem's Eurovision exploits, he undertook various musical ventures, which included new wave and punk music. Brem also became a music journalist, and joined Philip Morris as a marketing consultant 1988, only to return to the music industry in 1992 as marketing director for Phonogram/Universal. In 1995 Brem became Vice President International Marketing for Sony Music Entertainment Europe in London, and in 1997 he took helm at Columbia Records in Berlin. Since 2012, Brem has been Head of Audio Portfolio for Red Bull Media House in Salzburg.

Brem's wife Ursula died in 2001, leaving him with two sons, at that time 9 and 11 years old. Inspired by his wife's hobby of collecting kimonos and a massive collection thereof, he started Sai So, a fashion boutique offering various parts of apparel, as well as other items, made of vintage kimono fabric. He now also heads the Berlin office of the German portal utopia.de.

References 

 International Herald Tribune article on Sai So
 Sai So website
 Utopia.de – team 

20th-century Austrian male singers
Eurovision Song Contest entrants for Austria
German fashion businesspeople
Eurovision Song Contest entrants of 1980
Eurovision Song Contest entrants of 1981
Music industry executives
1959 births
Living people
Austrian emigrants to Germany